Goudkoffia is an extinct genus of prehistoric bony fish that lived during the Maastrichtian stage of the Late Cretaceous epoch.

See also

 Prehistoric fish
 List of prehistoric bony fish

References

Late Cretaceous fish
Cretaceous animals of North America